The 3rd constituency of Essonne is a French legislative constituency in the Essonne département.

Description

The 3rd constituency of Essonne covers a large swath of the centre of the department, reaching towards the edge of the suburbs of Paris. The seat today covers none of the territory of its predecessor between 1967 and 1986, which was located in the north of Essonne around Juvisy-sur-Orge and Massy.

Since 1988 control of the seat has switched between left and right in line with the national result.

Historic Representation

Election results

2022

 
 
 
 
 
 
 
 
 
 
|-
| colspan="8" bgcolor="#E9E9E9"|
|-

2017

 
 
 
 
 
 
 
|-
| colspan="8" bgcolor="#E9E9E9"|
|-

2012

 
 
 
 
 
 
|-
| colspan="8" bgcolor="#E9E9E9"|
|-

2007

 
 
 
 
 
 
 
|-
| colspan="8" bgcolor="#E9E9E9"|
|-

2002

 
 
 
 
 
|-
| colspan="8" bgcolor="#E9E9E9"|
|-

1997

 
 
 
 
 
 
 
 
 
|-
| colspan="8" bgcolor="#E9E9E9"|
|-

Sources

Official results of French elections from 2002: "Résultats électoraux officiels en France" (in French).

3